Där vi en gång gått is a novel written by Finnish author and journalist Kjell Westö, published by Otava publishers. Westö won the prestigious Finlandia Prize for it.

It is a historical novel set in Helsinki in the period from 1905 until 1944. Among its motifs is the often vain search for happiness, love and prosperity. It tells the stories of the aristocratic Lilliehjelm family, the middle-class Widing family and the poor Kajander family from Finland's independence through the Civil War and the Roaring Twenties, and ending during the Second World War.

Main characters

Lucie Lilliehjelm, rebellious society beauty
Eccu Widing, sensitive photographer, in love with Lucie
Allan Kajander, working-class football hero
Cedric Lilliehjelm, Lucie's hot-tempered brother, member of the White Guard
Ivar Grandell, controversial journalist
Aina Gadolin, Eccu's wife
Rurik Lilliehjelm, Lucie's conservative father
Marie Lilliehjelm, Lucie's mother
Sigrid Lilliehjelm, Lucie's sister, masterful tennis player
Enok Kajander, Allan's father, member of the Red Guard
Vivan Kajander, Allan's mother
Jarl Widing, Eccu's father
Atti Widing, Eccu's sick mother
Nita Widing, Eccu's sister, later Cedric's wife
Mandi Salin, Allan's beau
Henning Lund, Cedric and Eccu's friend
Henriette Hultqvist, actress, Grandell's mistress
Olga, Lilliehjelms' housekeeper

2006 novels
Finnish historical novels
21st-century Finnish novels
Novels set in Helsinki
Swedish-language novels